Elizabeth Ellis (born 1943) is an American storyteller and author known for her live performances of traditional tales, literature, Texas and Appalachian history and folklore, and personal memoir. She was awarded the Circle of Excellence in 1997 by the National Storytelling Network after being recognized by her peers as a master storyteller. She is a regular performer at the National Storytelling Festival. She was selected as a "Listener's Choice" at the 30th Anniversary National Storytelling Festival and a Storyteller-In-Residence at the International Storytelling Center. She was the first recipient of the John Henry Faulk Award from the Tejas Storytelling Association.

Background and early career
Born in Winchester, Kentucky, in 1943, Ellis grew up in the Appalachian Mountains of Eastern Kentucky and Eastern Tennessee. Ellis credits her interest in stories to a storytelling family; she grew up hearing stories from her mother's parents and siblings.

Ellis went to library school and in the fall of 1969 became a children's librarian at the Dallas Public Library. When Ellis attended gigs of her musician friends, they would invite her on stage to tell stories between sets.

Festivals
American Storytelling Festivals performed at include the National Storytelling Festival, the Bay Area Storytelling Festival, the Corn Island Storytelling Festival, the Flying Leap Festival, Haunting In The Hills, the L.A.U.G.H.S. Festival, the Mariposa Storytelling Festival, the Mesa Storytelling Festival, the Taos Storytelling Festival, the Southern Ohio Storytelling Festival, the Timpanogos Storytelling Festival and the Texas Storytelling Festival.

Bibliography
 Inviting the Wolf In: Thinking About Difficult Stories, written with Loren Niemi, August House, 2006
 From Plot to Narrative, Parkhurst Brothers Publishing, 2012
 Every Day a Holiday: A Storyteller's Memoir, Parkhurst Brothers Publishing, 2014

Discography

 Like Meat Loves Salt and other tales, 1984
 I Will Not Talk in Class: Stories for Children, 1989
 Mothers and Daughters: Recorded Live At The National Storytelling Festival, 2001
 Meddling In Wal-Mart ®: Recorded Live At The Mariposa Storytelling Festival, 2002
 One Size Fits Some: Recorded Live At The National Storytelling Festival, 2008
 Wading In The Jordan: Recorded Live At The National Storytelling Festival, 2008

Awards
 Anne Izard Storyteller's Choice Award
2013, From Plot to Narrative
2014, Every Day a Holiday: A Storyteller's Memoir
 Oracle Award, National Storytelling Network
 1997 - Circle of Excellence
 2004 - South Central Region Service and Leadership
 2013 - Lifetime Achievement Award
 Storytelling World Special Storytelling Resources
2002: Inviting the Wolf In
2013: From Plot to Narrative
 Tejas Storytelling Association 1986: John Henry Faulk Award

See also
Storytelling
Storytelling festival

References

External links

A one-hour interview on the Art of Storytelling with Brother Wolf Elizabeth Ellis' speaks about Storytelling and the development of ethical behavior in young people.

Living people
American storytellers
Women storytellers
1943 births
People from Winchester, Kentucky